William Riddle Marshall (September 22, 1875 in Butler, Pennsylvania – December 11, 1959 in Clinton, Illinois), was a professional baseball player who played catcher for several National League clubs from 1904 to 1909. He briefly managed the Chicago Whales during the inaugural Federal League season.

Marshall began his professional career relatively late in life, at the age of 27 in 1903, with the Des Moines Undertakers of the Western League, after working as a schoolteacher. He made it to the major leagues in 1904, and bounced around the National League during his first season. He made his debut on April 15, 1904 (the second game of the season) for the Philadelphia Phillies. He stayed on their roster for two months, and then played one game in July for the New York Giants. He then played eleven games for the Boston Beaneaters in August before finishing up the season with the Giants.  The Giants won the National League pennant that season but no World Series was played.

He spent 1906 in the top level of the minor leagues, with the Minneapolis Millers of the American Association, before returning the National League in 1907, first with the Giants and then with the Saint Louis Cardinals.

In 1907, while playing for the Giants and Cardinals he led all catchers in assists and errors.

During the 1908 season, the last-place Cardinals sold him to the league-leading Chicago Cubs. He was included on the Cubs' 22-man roster for the 1908 World Series but he did not play.  The Cubs beat the Detroit Tigers 4 games to 1. The next season, the Cubs sold Marshall to the Brooklyn Superbas, where he served as the backup catcher to Bill Bergen.  Bergen set a post-1900 record for futility at the plate by a regular position player which still stands, batting .139 in 112 games. Marshall hit somewhat better in his 50 games, batting .201. This proved to be Marshall's last major league season, although he played four more seasons in the minors.

He also played with the Des Moines Undertakers of the Western League and the Milwaukee Brewers and St. Paul Saints of the American Association.

During his baseball career, in both the minor and major leagues, Marshall studied medicine part-time, earning his doctorate in 1909. After retiring from baseball, he bought the practice of a local doctor in the small town of Clinton, Illinois, and served patients in east-central Illinois for 45 years from 1914 to 1959.  His brother Dr. E.H. Marshall was his business and professional partner.

He attended college at Grove City College, Slippery Rock University, the University of Pennsylvania and the Chicago College of Medicine and Surgery.

External links

 

1875 births
1959 deaths
Grove City Wolverines baseball players
Slippery Rock baseball players
Penn Quakers baseball players
Major League Baseball catchers
Brooklyn Superbas players
Philadelphia Phillies players
New York Giants (NL) players
Boston Beaneaters players
St. Louis Cardinals players
Chicago Cubs players
Baseball players from Pennsylvania
Des Moines Undertakers players
Minneapolis Millers (baseball) players
Milwaukee Brewers (minor league) players
St. Paul Saints (AA) players
20th-century American physicians
People from Butler, Pennsylvania
People from Clinton, Illinois